Fraser Mullen  (born 8 November 1993 in Glasgow, Scotland) is a professional footballer, who plays as a right-back for Pollok. Mullen has previously played for both Edinburgh derby rivals, Heart of Midlothian and Hibernian, as well as Raith Rovers and East Fife.

Career

Heart of Midlothian
Mullen joined the Heart of Midlothian youth academy aged 12. He progressed to the under-19 squad and was promoted to the first team on 10 December 2011, when he was an unused substitute in the match against Celtic. Mullen made his first team debut on 7 January 2012, in a Scottish Cup tie against Auchinleck Talbot; he took a penalty kick that was saved by the Auchinleck goalkeeper in the first half. Hearts manager Paulo Sergio described Mullen as his man of the match. His next appearance came the following season on 26 January 2013, playing from the start in a 2012–13 Scottish League Cup semi-final win against Inverness Caledonian Thistle. His season was ended prematurely as he suffered a fractured foot during an Edinburgh derby on 10 March, ruling him out of the 2013 Scottish League Cup Final. Mullen left the club at the end of the season after he was advised that he would not be offered a new contract.

Hibernian
Mullen signed a one-year contract with Hibernian, the Edinburgh derby rivals of Hearts, in June 2013. He then went on to score a free kick in his first game, a friendly against Gibraltar. Mullen failed to hold down a regular place in the Hibs first team, making just four appearances, with the last coming on 17 August and was allowed to leave the club in January 2014.

Raith Rovers
On 10 January 2014, Mullen signed a contract with Scottish Championship side Raith Rovers until the end of the 2013–14 season. He made his debut the following day, playing from the start in a 0–0 draw against Greenock Morton at Cappielow.

East Fife
Mullen signed a one-year contract with East Fife in June 2014. He won League Two with them in 2015/16.

Cowdenbeath
Mullen signed for  Cowdenbeath in 2016. He spent six seasons with the Blue Brazil, making over 200 appearances for them before leaving at the end of the  2021/22 season following their relegation to the  Lowland League .

Pollok
Mullen signed for  Pollok in the West of Scotland Football League in June 2022. He made his competitive debut in the first match of the West of Scotland Premier Division season - a 3-1 win away to Petershill. He was then named man of the match on his home debut the following week in a 0-0 draw with Largs Thistle. A further man of the match award arrived in the Lok's 4-3 win at home to Annan Athletic in the Scottish Cup, where Mullen set up the first goal and scored a free-kick to make it 3-1.

International career
Mullen has represented Scotland at under-17 level.

Career statistics

Honours

Club 
Raith Rovers
Scottish Challenge Cup: 2013–14 

East Fife
 Scottish League Two: 2015-16

References

1993 births
Living people
Footballers from Glasgow
Scottish footballers
Scotland youth international footballers
Heart of Midlothian F.C. players
Hibernian F.C. players
Raith Rovers F.C. players
Association football fullbacks
Scottish Premier League players
Scottish Professional Football League players
East Fife F.C. players
Cowdenbeath F.C. players